Prunus mira, the smooth stone peach, smooth-pit peach or Tibetan peach, and locally called behmi, behimi or tirul, is a species of Prunus native to the foothills of the Himalayas and the Tibetan plateau, at elevations typically between 2600 and 3000m, but ranging from 2000 to 4000m.

Description 
Prunus mira grows to 8-12m tall and the trunks 16cm in diameter (DBH). The leaves are lanceolate, 5–10cm long and 1.2–4cm wide. The flowers are pinkish white. The 2-by-3cm ovoid fruit has white flesh. As the common name suggests, the stone is smooth.

Uses 
The trees are cultivated in some parts of their native range, for their fruit (which is often pickled), their seeds (as a substitute for almonds), and for their seed oil, which is used for cooking and hair oil. The rootstocks are used for almonds and for dwarfing peach trees, and are resistant to powdery mildew.

References

External links 
 

Peaches
Flora of China
Flora of East Himalaya
Flora of West Himalaya
Flora of Nepal
Flora of Pakistan
Trees of Tibet
Plants described in 1912
Prunus